Kezban Tağ (17 September 1993) is a Turkish women's football defender currently playing in the Turkish First League for ALG Spor with jersey number 13. She is a member of the Turkey women's national team.

Club career 

Kezban Tağ obtained her license from Zeytinburnuspor on 16 October 2010. She played in two matches for Zeytinburnuspor in the second half of the Women's Second League's 2009–10 season. The next season, she was with the high school team Altınşehir Lisesi Spor. In the 2011-12 Second League season, she played four games for Bakırköy Zara. In the beginning of 2014, she moved to Eskişehir to join Eskişehirspor. She enjoyed her team's promotion to the Women's First League at the end of the season. After playing the 2014-15 First League season for Eskişehirspor, she returned to her hometown Istanbul and signed with the newly promoted club Kireçburnu Spor. She played the first halves of the 2015-16 and 2016-17 seasons for Kireçburnu Spor. In the second half of the 2016–17 season then, she transferred to Ataşehir Belediyespor. In the 2017-18, Tağ played for Beşiktaş J.K. After one season, she moved to the Black Sea town Karadeniz Ereğli to appear for Kdz. Ereğli Belediye Spor. In the 2019-20 Women's First League season, she transferred to the Gaziantep-based club ALG Spor. She enjoyed the 2021-22 Women's Super League champion title of her team. On 18 August 2022, she debuted in the 2022–23 UEFA Women's Champions League.

International career 
Tağ was admitted to the Turkey women's national team for the first time in January 2019, remained, however, on the bench in two friendly games against Slovakia. She debuted in the friendly match against Moldova on 14 June 2019. She took part at the UEFA Women's Euro 2021 qualifying Group A.

Career statistics 
.

Honours 
 Turkish Women's First Football League
 Ataşehir Belediyespor
 Third places (1): 2016–17

 Beşiktaş J.K.
 Runners-up (1): 2017–18

 ALG Spor
 Winners (2): 2019–20, 2021-22
 Third places (1): 2020–21

 Turkish Women's Second Football League
 Eskişehirspor
 Winners (1): 2013–14

References 

1993 births
Living people
People from Küçükçekmece
Footballers from Istanbul
Turkish women's footballers
Turkey women's international footballers
Women's association football defenders
Eskişehirspor women's players
Kireçburnu Spor players
Ataşehir Belediyespor players
Beşiktaş J.K. women's football players
Karadeniz Ereğlispor players
ALG Spor players
Turkish Women's Football Super League players
21st-century Turkish sportswomen